Momba may refer to:
 Momba, Zambia, a former kingdom in Zambia
 Momba District, a district in Tanzania
 Momba Station, a pastoral lease in outback New South Wales, Australia
 Momba River, a river in Tanzania and Zambia
 Momba, Gourma, settlement in Fada N’Gourma Department, Gourma Province, Burkina Faso
 Momba, name of the Wicked Witch of the West in  The Wonderful Wizard of Oz (1910 film)